SS Orcades was an ocean liner serving primarily the UK – Australia – New Zealand route. She started service as a British Royal Mail Ship (RMS) carrying first and tourist class passengers. Orcades carried many migrants to Australia and New Zealand  and was later used as a cruise ship, and is featured in the British Pathe films "I am a passenger" on YouTube.  She also made several voyages from Canada (Vancouver). "Orcades" is the Latin name for the Orkney Islands.

Built at the Barrow-in-Furness yard of Vickers-Armstrong, Orcades (yard no. 950) had an identical hull and machinery to P&O's  (yard no. 951), but differed in superstructure and interior layout.

In 1952 Orcades was fitted with a 'top hat' funnel extension to clear smoke from the after decks. On 7 May 1952, she ran aground in Port Philip Bay half a mile off Rosebud Pier, Victoria, Australia. She was refloated and returned to service.

During the 1956 Summer Olympics in Melbourne, Australia, Orcades served as an accommodation ship.

Orcades was refitted in 1959 and 1964. In the 1964 refit, Orcades became a single-class vessel and her hull colour changed from "Orient corn" to white.

Gallery

Footnotes

Further reading 

 Latimer, David W (2002) Passenger ships of the 20th century: an illustrated encyclopedia, p. 259, Colourpoint Books

External links
 Museum Victoria
 Ocean liner museum
 Photographs and deck plans 
 ssMaritime
British Pathe films "I am a passenger" on YouTube

1947 ships
Ships built in Barrow-in-Furness
Cruise ships
Ships of the Orient Line
Passenger ships of the United Kingdom
Steamships of the United Kingdom
Maritime incidents in 1952